This is a list of properties and districts in Upson County, Georgia that are listed on the National Register of Historic Places (NRHP).

Current listings

|}

References

Upson
Upson County, Georgia